The Rajakulathor people, who are also collectively known as Rajaka, are native to the Tamil Nadu, Andhra Pradesh, Karnataka, India. They comprise the Vannar, Madivala and Agasa social groups that share a common myth of origin and claim to have once been members of various ancient South Indian dynasties.

Etymology 
The following is current regarding the origin of the caste On the occasion of Dakshas sacrifice Virabhadra got his clothes blood stained,while killing Daksha and his companions.He appeared before Shiva and thoughtlessly allowed his impure garments to come into contact with the God.Rajakas are known as veeraghata madivala on account of their supposed descend from god Virabhadra the son of Shiva.

Right hand caste faction 
Rajakulathor belongs to the Valangai ("Right-hand caste faction"). Some of them assume the title Valangamattan ("people of the right-hand division"). The Valangai  comprised castes with an agricultural basis while the Idangai consisted of castes involved in manufacturing. Valangai, which was better organised politically.

History 
At the Pooram festival in Kerala,the goddess is usually seen wearing a white robe with a large handle in red, green, orange, black, white

In India,the largest Dasara festival in October in Karnataka and Tamil Nadu is held in honor of the honorable sword is given to the Vannars.

Vannars are also the priests of the Bhagavati Amman temple

Worships 
In the Tirunelveli region,Thai deities (female deities) are worshiped in large numbers and are worshiped with a pedestal or trident.in states like Karnataka and Andhra Pradesh,Vannars are still the priests of the Mariamman temple

Structure 
The common honorific titles used by the Rajakulathor are "Rajakula", "Pandiyan", "Mooppar", "kaathavarayan", "Yegaveni", "Nair", "Saayakaran", "Mesthiri", "Thoosar", and "Kaliyar" varying according to their territorial divisions.According to Raja Raja cholan inscription,the villages in Chola administration were termed as "Vannathar"

Notable persons 
Periyathambiran -Ruler of Anuradhapura,Sri Lanka
Neelasothaiyan -Commander-in-Chief of King Periyathambiran
A. M. Saravanam -was an indian Congress Freedom fighter

See also 
Jyestha

References

Indian castes